Richard Crowley (December 14, 1836 – July 22, 1908) was a United States representative from New York. He was born in Pendleton, New York. He attended the public schools and Lockport Union School. Later, he studied law, was admitted to the bar in 1860, and commenced practice in Lockport.

Crowley was City Attorney of Lockport from 1865 to 1866. He was admitted to practice before the Supreme Court of the United States in 1865, and was a member of the New York State Senate (29th D.) in 1866, 1867, 1868 and 1869. He was appointed by President Ulysses S. Grant as United States Attorney for the Northern District of New York on March 23, 1871 and was reappointed March 3, 1875, and served in that capacity until March 3, 1879.

Crowley was elected as a Republican to the 46th and 47th United States Congresses, holding office from March 4, 1879, to March 3, 1883. While in Congress, he was Chairman of the Committee on Claims (47th Congress). After leaving Congress, he resumed the practice of law in Lockport. He was appointed by Governor Levi P. Morton in 1896 as counsel for the State of New York in American Civil War claims cases, in which capacity he was serving at the time of his death at Olcott Beach, New York in 1908. He was buried in Lockport's Glenwood Cemetery.

References

 Crowley, Julia M Corbitt. Echoes from Niagara. Buffalo, N.Y.: C. W. Moulton, 1890.

1836 births
1908 deaths
United States Attorneys for the Northern District of New York
Republican Party New York (state) state senators
Politicians from Lockport, New York
Republican Party members of the United States House of Representatives from New York (state)
People from Pendleton, New York
19th-century American politicians